West German rearmament began in the decades after the World War II. Fears of another rise of German militarism caused the new military to operate within an alliance framework, under NATO command. The events led to the establishment of the Bundeswehr, the West German military, in 1955. The name Bundeswehr was a compromise choice suggested by former general Hasso von Manteuffel to distinguish the new forces from the Wehrmacht term for the combined German forces of Nazi Germany.

Background

The 1945 Morgenthau Plan had called to reduce Allied-occupied Germany to a pre-industrial state by eliminating its arms industry and other key industries essential to military strength, thus removing its ability to wage war. However, because of the cost of food imports to Germany, and the fear that poverty and hunger would drive desperate Germans toward communism, the US government signalled a moderation of this plan in September 1946 with Secretary of State James F. Byrnes's speech Restatement of Policy on Germany. While this gave Germans hope for the future, it also evidenced the emergence of the Cold War.

The vigorous disarmament program in Germany continued by the UK and US for the first three years of occupation. This dismantling of industry became increasingly unpopular and ran contrary to the 1948 Marshall Plan's mission to encourage industrial growth.

On August 29, 1949, the Soviet Union detonated the RDS-1 atomic bomb, which forced a reevaluation of the defense requirements of Western Europe. In June 1950, the Korean War began and raised fears in West Germany, with comparisons drawn between the actions of North Korea and the possible actions of East Germany. Both France and the United Kingdom were wary of the revival of German military potential, having been severely tested in the world wars. Aneurin Bevan and his left-wing faction of the Labour Party rebelled against the party line in a parliamentary vote supporting West German rearmament, and seized control of the party's National Executive Committee. American political figures, such as Senator Elmer Thomas, argued that West Germany needed to be included in a defensive system, stating "several divisions of German troops should be armed by the United States without Germany herself being permitted to manufacture arms." German Chancellor Konrad Adenauer was determined to use offers of rearmament to regain sovereignty for West Germany.

During the September 1950 NATO meeting, France decided to become isolated for the rearmament operation because they did not want Germany to join NATO. West Germany wanted to join NATO because of Adenauer's desire to appease the fears of its neighbors and show a willingness to cooperate. Initial skepticism by the US was set aside after Dwight D Eisenhower endorsed the deal, and West Germany agreed to support the operation. One of the better-known attempts to win West Germany the right to re-arm was the European Defense Community (EDC). A modification of the 1950 Pleven Plan, it proposed the raising of West German forces integrated into a European Defense Force. When West Germany embraced an edited plan and the push for rearmament seemed to be assured, France vetoed the attempt in August 1954. In 1955, West Germany joined NATO.

Bundeswehr formation

Neither East nor West Germany had any regular armed forces at the time, though they did have paramilitary police forces (the western Bundesgrenzschutz and eastern Kasernierte Volkspolizei). The Bundeswehr (West German military) was armed originally from Military Assistance Program funds from the US. Former Kriegsmarine ships, seized under the Tripartite Naval Commission, were returned by the US. Slowly, West German sailors were stationed on United States Navy ships and West Germany helped to supply the navy. This operation was intended to ensure that West Germany possessed an effective military force. The US supplied the potential sailors with intensive training to help build up the German Navy for the future. The German generals wanted a small air force, the Luftwaffe, focused on supporting ground operations. Chancellor Konrad Adenauer's budget called for limited air power. However the United States Air Force leaders, coordinating with the small Luftwaffe staff, successfully promoted a much larger Luftwaffe along American lines.

West Germany set a goal to have up to 500,000 men in military service, partly due to Theodor Blank's desire for West Germany to have a more significant military than Italy in order to project power and increase its contributions. To get his point across, he used this chart:

To reach that goal, the West German border security force (Bundesgrenzschutz) was transformed into military personnel, utilizing both conscripts and volunteers. West Germany instituted a policy of conscription, despite apprehension that the new fighting force would be compared to the Nazi-era Wehrmacht. Erik Reger, the editor of the Berlin daily Tagesspiegel, was noted as saying "As soon as Germany has soldiers, there will be war", arguing that military support could lead to a rightward shift in national politics. The Social Democrats argued that even though the military was expanded to a positive reception, it would not be enough to revive German militarism.

Among many former German officers, however, there was the conviction that no future German army could be possible without a rehabilitation of the Wehrmacht. To this end, a group of former senior officers gathered on 9 October 1950 at Himmerod Abbey to produce a memorandum for Adenauer, which included these key demands:
All German soldiers convicted as war criminals (Kriegsverurteilte) would be released
The defamation of the German soldier, including those from the Waffen-SS, would have to cease
Measures to assure the welfare of former soldiers and their widows would have to be taken

Adenauer accepted these propositions and in turn advised the representatives of the three Western powers that a German military would not be possible as long as German soldiers remained in custody or were brought before courts. The willingness of the former Allies to commute a number of sentences for incarcerated officers undoubtedly tied back to that condition. In the early months of 1951, public declarations from Dwight D. Eisenhower and other United States Armed Forces officers followed, outlining "a real difference between the German soldier and Hitler and his criminal group".

Bundesmarine formation

The US established the Naval Historical Team (NHT) to help with the Anglo-American World War II naval historical project. Both countries recruited German naval veterans and naval activists to help expand the future West German navy by gaining a better perspective of the previous naval war. However, the NHT soon shifted focus to pursue information about Soviet naval forces. The initial goal was to study the landings and targets of the Soviet navy. This agency became the coordinating staff of the Bundesmarine, the West German navy. Another group of veterans of the former Kriegsmarine, called "labor service units", were assigned to similar tasks of deciphering surveillance. Adenauer created the Blank Office (Amt Blank) to use West German defense contributions as leverage for increased sovereignty. With the different organizations working together, a naval proposal referred to as the Wagner Paper was adopted to use as a negotiation tool at the February 1951 conference of the EDC, held in Paris. However, France forced a deadlock, opposing the threat of naval rearmament. especially as it had perceived links to the Nazi regime. To resolve the issue, the Wagner Paper was sent to the Supreme Headquarters Allied Powers Europe (SHAPE), which was in favor of naval rearmament. France compromised, offering some escort ships and accepting the naval buildup. However, the West German military remained under the supreme allied NATO control, which diminished its command positions.

Effects

The growth of the German Bundeswehr proved a key element in the growth of West German influence in central Europe. This, along with the 1951 Treaty of Paris, cemented the elements of Western European economic cooperation, and helped to integrate post-war West Germany into the European community. At the same time, the Soviet Union used this as a foundational justification to implement the Warsaw Pact, which provided substantial military and political control over key Eastern European states.

References

Sources and further reading 
 Beisner, Robert L. Dean Acheson: a life in the Cold War (Oxford University Press, 2009) pp. 356–374.
 Corum, James S. "Building a New Luftwaffe: The United States Air Force and Bundeswehr Planning for Rearmament, 1950–60." Journal of Strategic Studies 27#1 (2004): 89-113.</
 Curtis, Glenn. "The Warsaw Pact" in Czechoslovakia: A Country Study (2008)
 Granieri, Ronald J. The Ambivalent Alliance: Konrad Adenauer, the CDU/CSU, and the West, 1949-1966 (Berghahn Books, 2003).
 Guderian, Heinz, Kann Westeuropa verteidigt werden?, Göttingen, 1950; and idem, So geht es nicht, Heidelberg, 1951.
 Halsall, Paul. "Treaty Of Friendship, Co-Operation And Mutual Assistance." Modern History Sourcebook. November 1998 . Internet Modern History Sourcebook. 18 Feb 2008
 Hershberg, James G. "'Explosion in the Offing: German Rearmament and American Diplomacy, 1953–1955." Diplomatic History 16.4 (1992): 511-550.
 Large, David K. Germans to the Front: West German Rearmament in the Adenauer Era. Chapel Hill, University of North Carolina Press, 1996.
 Snyder, David R., "Arming the "Bundesmarine": The United States and the Build-Up of the German Federal Navy, 1950–1960." Journal of Military History, Vol. 66, No. 2. (Apr., 2002), pp. 477–500.
 Speier, Hans. German Rearmament and Atomic War. Evanston, Illinois: Row, Peterson and Company, 1957.
 
 Zimmermann, Hubert. Money and Security: Troops, Monetary Policy, and West Germany's Relations with the United States and Britain, 1950-1971 (2002)

Aftermath of World War II in Germany
Cold War history of Germany
Naval history of Germany
Bundeswehr
Cold War